AFRC can be an initialism for:

Advanced Frame Rate Converter, used for frame rate control
Agricultural and Food Research Council, British farming and horticulture organisation
Air Force Reserve Command, major command of the United States Air Force
Arkansas Forest Resource Center, University of Arkansas at Monticello, United States
Armed Forces Revolutionary Council, rebel group in Sierra Leone
Armed Forces Revolutionary Council, Ghana, ruled Ghana for 4 months in 1979
Armed Forces Recreation Center, resorts run by the United States Armed Forces for members of the military and their families
Neil A. Armstrong Flight Research Center, a NASA center on Edwards Air Force Base in California, United States

See also

Australian Family Relationships Clearinghouse Issues, aka AFRC Issues
American Flame Research Committee, component of the International Flame Research Foundation